Telangana Shakuntala (27 March 1951 – 14 June 2014) was an Indian actress who worked in the Telugu cinema. She was known chiefly for playing comedy and villainous characters in Tollywood. Her performances in movies like Osey Ramulamma, Nuvvu Nenu, Lakshmi, Okkadu and Veede were well received. She also acted on television and in Tamil-language films, where she is known for her role as Sornakka in Dhool. She was well known for her ability to speak in the Telangana and Rayalaseema dialects of the Telugu language and thus majority of her roles in Telugu cinema exhibited this.

Early life
She was born in a Maharastrian family in Maharashtra, India. Her father was an Army Officer and her mother a housewife. She has four sisters.

Career
She made her stage début in a play at Ravindra Bharathi. She did many plays after that. She started her film career by playing a character role in 1979 Telugu film Maa Bhoomi directed by Goutam Ghose.

Personal life

She mainly acted in Telugu movies. Throughout her career she was acclaimed Marathi stage artist. She fell in love with the Telugu language when a touring stage troupe performed in her native village and she insisted on joining it. She was asked to learn the language to be able to perform well, which she mastered within a year. In one of the final interviews with MAATV, Shakunthala expressed that if she has a rebirth, she will be born in to a Telugu speaking family expressing her love for Telugu language.

Death
Shakuntala suffered cardiac arrest at her Hyderabad home on the morning of 14 June 2014, five months after her 63rd birthday. She was admitted to Narayana Hrudayalaya at around 2:30 AM IST, where she was declared dead upon arrival.

Awards
 Best Actress, Nandi Award – 1980

Filmography

 1979 – Maa Bhoomi
 1980 - Kukka
 1983 - Muddula Mogudu
 1987 – Aha Naa Pellanta
 1991 – Seetharamayya Gari Manavaralu
 1994 – Erra Sainyam
 1995 – Gulabi
 1996 – Coolanna 
 1997 – Osey Ramulamma
 1998 – Ganesh
 2001 – Badrachalam
 2001 – Orumanadira
 2001 – Nuvvu Nenu
 2002 - Neetho Cheppalani
 2002 – Sandade Sandadi
 2002 - Tappu Chesi Pappu Koodu
 2002 - Nee Sneham
 2002 – Kondaveeti Simhasanam
 2002 – Sontham
 2002 - Indra
 2002 – Netho Cheppalani
 2003 – Amma Meeda Ottu
 2003 – Abhimanyu
 2003 – Dhool (Tamil)
 2003 – Veede
 2003 – Vishnu
 2003 – Sambu
 2003 – Gangotri
 2003 – Charminar
 2003 – Pellamto Panenti
 2003 – Simahachalam
 2003 – Okkadu
 2003 - Toli Choopulone
 2004 – Adavi Ramudu
 2004 - Super Da (Tamil)
 2004 – Donga Dongadi
 2004 – Preminchukunnam Pelliki Randi
 2004 – Pallakilo Pelli Kuturu
 2005 – Orey Pandu
 2005 – Okkade
 2005 – Evadi Gola Vaadidhi
 2005 – Sivakasi (Tamil)
 2005 – Sadaa Mee Sevalo
 2006 – Lakshmi
 2006 – Sri Krishna 2006
 2006 - Ajay (Kannada)
 2006 – Annavaram
 2006 – Oka V Chitram
 2006 – Sainikudu
 2007 – Aadivaram Adavallaku Selavu 
 2007 – Desamuduru
 2007 – Madurai Veeran (Tamil)
 2007 - Julayi
 2007 – Viyyalavari Kayyalu
 2007 – Dubai Seenu
 2007 – Lakshmi Kalyanam
 2008 – Mallepuvvu
 2008 – Jabilamma
 2008 – Ankusham
 2008 – Kuberulu
 2008 – Siddu from Sikakulam
 2009 – Pista
 2009 – Bendu Apparao R.M.P
 2009 – Current
 2009 – Kavi
 2009 – Nirnayam
 2009 – A Aa E Ee
 2009 – Evaraina Epudaina
 2009 – Maska
 2010 – Namo Venkatesa
 2010 – Bramhalokam To Yamalokam Via Bhulokam
 2010 – Okka Kshanam
 2010 – Andhra Kiran Bedi
 2010 – Happy Happy Ga
 2010 – Komaram Bheem
 2010 – Chapter 6
 2010 – Sivangi
 2010 – Bindaas
 2010 – Ranga The Donga
 2010 – Neeku Naaku
 2010 – Glamour
 2010 – Kalyanram Kathi
 2010 – Maa Nanna Chiranjeevi
 2010 – Buridi
 2010 – Panchakshari
 2011 – Pilla Dorikithe Pelli
 2011 – Rajanna
 2012 – Ee Vesavilo O Prema Katha
 2012 – Guruvaram
 2012 – Aada Paandavulu
 2012 - All the best
 2012 – Peoples War
 2013 – Naa Anevaadu
 2013 – Amma Yellamma
 2013 – Rayalaseema Express
 2013 - Jabardasth
 2013 – Sound Party
 2013 – Nirbaya Bharatham
 2013 – Emaindi Eevela
 2013 – Chandee 
 2014 – Pandavulu Pandavulu Tummeda
 2014 – Malligadu Marriage Bureau
 2014 – Bhimavaram Bullodu
 2014 – Rajyadikaram

References

External links
 

Telugu comedians
Indian film actresses
Indian television actresses
1951 births
2014 deaths
Marathi people
Actresses in Telugu cinema
Actresses in Tamil cinema